Bengaloored is a 2010 Indian English feature film set in Bangalore, directed by Swaroop Kanchi. The film stars Harish Raj and Meghana Mudiyam.

Plot
Babruahana returns home to Bangalore from France and hopes to author a book. He goes to meet gorgeous Radha, a school-friend, on whom he always had a crush. Both meet and continue meeting, and Babruahana hopes to propose to her soon. He then sets about to meet his favorite author, Ramana, as well as his estranged love, Vanamala. He does not look forward to meeting his widowed father, but does so, and finds him remarried to Madhu. He will also find that a six-lane highway is about to be built around his ancestral home, which may be demolished. He also catches up with his friend, Siddharth, who has become a much-revered Sanyasi. As he struggles to adapt to the changes - nothing will prepare him for the shocks that await him.

Cast
 Harish Raj ... Babruahana 
 Meghana Mudiyam ... Radha
 Srinivas Prabhu ... Ramana 
 Lakshmi Chandrashekar ... Vanamala 
 R. T. Kumar ... Babruahana's father 
 Suma Vinod ... Madhu 
 H. V. Prakash ... BBMP Guy 
 Swaroop Kanchi ... Siddharth

Reception 
A critic from Bollywood Hungama wrote that "Really, this film is made for a very very very niche audience and even for that segment which revels on decoding art house cinema, Bengaloored could be quite an ordeal to sit through in entirety".

References

External links 
 
 Official Website

2010 films
2010s English-language films
Films set in Bangalore
English-language Indian films